Xuxa 2 is the eighth studio album and the second in Spanish language Brazilian pop singer, TV host and actress Xuxa. The album was released on April 25, 1991 by BMG in Spain and other countries in Europe, the United States and Latin America.

The tracks did not undergo major changes, the instrumental sounded more pleasant and with a more Latin beat. The song "Crocki Crocki" is the only one that does not belong to the last two albums, but to Xegundo Xou da Xuxa (1987). The album was produced by Michael Sullivan and Paulo Massadas. The direction of the voice and the versions of the songs were made by Graciela Carballo.

Production 
The album was produced by Michael Sullivan and Paulo Massadas with artistic coordination by Max Pierre and Marlene Mattos. The repertoire selection was made by Xuxa, Mattos and Sullivan. The recordings were made at the Som Livre studio in Los Angeles.

Like the previous album, Xuxa consists of some hits from the Spanish-language TV presenter such as "Tindolelê" ("Chindolele"), "Hada Madrina" ("Dinda Ou Dindinha"), "I Love You Xuxu" and "Luna de Cristal" "("Lua de Cristal"). The song "El milagro de la vida" was the opening theme of the Argentine telenovela El árbol azul, which was shown between 1991 and 1992 by El Trece.

The cover of "Xuxa 2" was chosen in August 1990, before the album was even recorded. The recordings of the album did not begin until October of that same year (then, there was no photographic essay for the album "Xuxa 2" and Xou da Xuxa Seis but a reuse of the essay for Xuxa 5), including, the photographer Paulo Rocha is credited to all 3 albums. For that, in the cover of the Xou album of the Xou da Xuxa Seis, it appears in the lower left corner of the cover, it owns a Brazilian flag, to inform the consumers that is the portuguese version of the album.

Release and reception
The album was distributed internationally by Globo Records and released on April 25, 1991 in Latin America, the United States and some European countries, such as Spain (by RCA Records).

Xuxa reached the seventh position in the ranking Billboard Latin Pop Albums on July 27, 1991, during 27 consecutive weeks the album was among the best sellers.

Track listing

Personnel

Produced: Michael Sullivan and Paulo Massadas
Artistic Coordination: Max Pierre, Marlene Mattos
Selection of repertoire: Xuxa, Marlene Mattos, Michael Sullivan
Art Direction in Spanish: Graciela Carballo
Spanish Art Direction: Maria Haydeé, Ester Piro
Voice recording of the adult choir: Graciela Carballo
Artistic Coordination: Helio Costa Manso
Technicians of additional recordings: Luis Paulo, Marcos Caminha
Recorded at the studios: Som Livre (Los Angeles)
Engineer of choir recording and mixing in Spanish: Moogie Canazio
Musical Direction for Choir: Kenny O Brien
Studio Assistants and Mixing: Marcelo Serôdio, Julio Carneiro Cláudio Oliveira, Cesar Barbosa, Ivan Carvalho, Mauro Moraes
Recording and mixing engineer: Jorge Gordo Guimarães, Luis Guilherme D Orey.

Charts

Chart positions

Single

Sales and certifications

References

External links 
 Xuxa 2 at Discogs

1991 albums
Xuxa albums
Spanish-language albums
Children's music albums by Brazilian artists